The BP Tournament was a golf tournament held in New Zealand from 1964 to 1968. Four of the five events were held at Titirangi Golf Club, Auckland. Kel Nagle won the event three times, including a tie. In the other two events he was runner-up and third.

Winners

References

Golf tournaments in New Zealand
Recurring sporting events established in 1964
Recurring events disestablished in 1968
1964 establishments in New Zealand
1968 disestablishments in New Zealand